Mareena Michael Kurisingal is an Indian actress and model who appears in Malayalam and Tamil films.

Career
She is best known for her role in the 2017 film Aby opposite Vineeth Sreenivasan. Earlier Mareena has appeared in films like Happy Wedding and Amar Akbar Anthony. She has played lead roles in Mumbai Taxi and Ennul Aayiram.

Filmography

Films

Short films

TV shows

References

External links 

  

Living people
Indian film actresses
Actresses in Malayalam cinema
21st-century Indian actresses
Actresses in Tamil cinema
Actresses in Malayalam television
1996 births